The Bergse Maas (pre-1947 spelling: Bergsche Maas) is a canal that was constructed in 1904 to be a branch of the river Maas (French: Meuse) in the Dutch province of North Brabant. The Maas splits near Heusden into the Afgedamde Maas and the Bergse Maas. The Afgedamde Maas flows north until its confluence with the river Waal (the main distributary of the river Rhine) to form the Merwede, while the Bergse Maas continues west as the main distributary of the Maas. Part of the Merwede (the Nieuwe Merwede) rejoins the Bergse Maas to form the Hollands Diep estuary.

History 
Historically, a natural branch of the Maas flowed from Heusden to the Amer and Hollands Diep estuary; this branch silted up and now forms a stream called Oude Maasje. The Bergse Maas, which takes its name from the town of Geertruidenberg, was constructed in its basin to take over its functions, in 1904. The other main distributary of the Maas was at the same time dammed-up and renamed Afgedamde Maas ("Dammed-up Meuse"). The resulting separation of the rivers Rhine and Maas reduced the risk of flooding and is considered to be the greatest achievement in Dutch hydraulic engineering before the completion of the Zuiderzee Works and Delta Works.

Transport 
There are two road bridges and three car ferries. The latter are free of charge for all traffic, as promised to the people living in the area when the Bergse Maas was dug.

References

External links 
 Ferries in North Brabant

Canals in the Rhine–Meuse–Scheldt delta
Canals opened in 1904
0BergseMaas
Land van Heusden en Altena
Geography of Altena, North Brabant
Geertruidenberg
Heusden
Waalwijk